C-C chemokine receptor type 2 (CCR2 or CD192 (cluster of differentiation 192) is a protein  that in humans is encoded by the CCR2 gene. CCR2 is a CC chemokine receptor.

Gene 

This CCR2 gene is located in the chemokine receptor gene cluster region. Two alternatively spliced transcript variants are expressed by the gene.

Function 

This gene encodes two isoforms of a receptor for monocyte chemoattractant protein-1 (CCL2), a chemokine which specifically mediates monocyte chemotaxis. Monocyte chemoattractant protein-1 is involved in monocyte infiltration in inflammatory diseases such as rheumatoid arthritis as well as in the inflammatory response against tumors. The receptors encoded by this gene mediate agonist-dependent calcium mobilization and inhibition of adenylyl cyclase.

Animal studies

Alzheimer

CCR2 deficient mice have been shown to develop an accelerated Alzheimer's-like pathology in comparison to wild type mice. This is not the first time that immune function and inflammation have been linked to age-related cognitive decline (i.e. dementia).

Obesity

Within the fat (adipose) tissue of CCR2 deficient mice, there is an increased number of eosinophils, greater alternative macrophage activation, and a propensity towards type 2 cytokine expression. Furthermore, this effect was exaggerated when the mice became obese from a high fat diet.

Myocardial Infarct

CCR2 surface expression on blood monocytes changes in a time-of-day–dependent manner (being higher at the beginning of the active phase) and affects monocytes recruitment in tissues including the heart. As a consequence when an acute ischemic event happens during the active phase, monocytes are more susceptible to invade the heart. An excessive monocytes infiltration generates higher inflammation and increases the risk of heart failure.

Clinical significance 

In an observational study of gene expression in blood leukocytes in humans, Harries et al. found evidence of a relationship between expression of CCR2 and cognitive function (assessed using the mini-mental state examination, MMSE). Higher CCR2 expression was associated with worse performance on the MMSE assessment of cognitive function. The same study found that CCR2 expression was also associated with cognitive decline over 9-years in a sub-analysis on inflammatory related transcripts only. Harries et al. suggest that CCR2 signaling may have a direct role in human cognition, partly because expression of CCR2 was associated with the ApoE haplotype (previously associated with Alzheimer's disease), but also because CCL2 is expressed at high concentrations in macrophages found in atherosclerotic plaques and in brain microglia. The difference in observations between mice (CCR2 depletion causes cognitive decline) and humans (higher CCR2 associated with lower cognitive function) could be due to increased demand for macrophage activation during cognitive decline, associated with increased β-amyloid deposition (a core feature of Alzheimer's disease progression).

See also 
CC chemokine receptors
 Cluster of differentiation

References

Further reading

External links 
 
 
 
 description at Information Hyperlinked Over Proteins

Chemokine receptors
Clusters of differentiation